Territories of Progress – Social Reformist Movement (TDP) was a French political party of the centre to centre-left. It was founded in February 2020 by Socialist Party ministers Jean-Yves Le Drian and Olivier Dussopt who had previously defected from that party to join the presidential majority (La République En Marche!) of Emmanuel Macron. Since October 2021, the party's president was Olivier Dussopt. The party constituted the social democratic or centre-left of the presidential majority. It merged into the presidential party in 2022.

As of 2022, it had 46 Members of Parliament. Élisabeth Borne was a regular member (not an elected member of Parliament) who, on 16 May 2022, was appointed by President Macron as Prime Minister to replace Jean Castex.

Creation 

The party officially launched on 1 February 2020, during a meeting in Pantin, in Seine-Saint-Denis, then presented at a press conference on 2 July 2020. Senator Xavier Iacovelli became its Secretary General. The party defined itself as "Social-democratic, reformist, and Europeanist."

Membership

Senators 
 Michel Dagbert
 Éric Gold
 André Guiol
 Claude Haut
 Xavier Iacovelli

Deputies of the 15th legislature of the French Fifth Republic

Former MPs 

Anne-Yvonne Le Dain
Gilles Savary

MEPs 

 Irène Tolleret

References 

Centrist parties in France
Liberal parties in France
Political parties established in 2020
Political parties disestablished in 2022
Political parties in France
2020 establishments in France
Political parties of the French Fifth Republic
Pro-European political parties in France
Social liberal parties
Social democratic parties in France